Pui Pui Protection Forest is a protected area in La Libertad, Peru, established on 31 January 1985.

References 

National forests of Peru